The Winston-Salem T-Birds were an ice hockey team in Winston-Salem, North Carolina. They played in the South East Hockey League for the 2003–04 season. They did not qualify for the playoffs, and folded after the season.

Season-by-season record

Records
Games: Chris Seifert, 55
Goals: Chris Seifert, 26
Assists: Chris Seifert, 32
Points: Chris Seifert, 58
PIM: Hunter Lahache, 228

External links
 The Internet Hockey Database

Ice hockey teams in North Carolina
South East Hockey League teams
Defunct ice hockey teams in the United States